Amt Nennhausen is an Amt ("collective municipality") in the district of Havelland, in Brandenburg, Germany. Its seat is in Nennhausen.

The Amt Nennhausen consists of the following municipalities:
Kotzen
Märkisch Luch
Nennhausen
Stechow-Ferchesar

Demography

References 

Nennhausen
Havelland (district)